Hopewell Creek is a stream in eastern Washington County in the U.S. state of Missouri. It is a tributary of the Big River. The stream source area lies southwest of Summit and it flows to the southeast parallel to Missouri Route 8. The village of Hopewell lies adjacent to the stream and Potosi Lake lies to the northeast.  The confluence with Big River is about two miles north of Irondale.

Hopewell Creek takes its name from the community of Hopewell which lies along its course.

See also
List of rivers of Missouri

References

Rivers of Washington County, Missouri
Rivers of Missouri